Orites milliganii, also known as Milligan's orites or the toothed orites, is a species of flowering plant in the protea family that is endemic to Tasmania, Australia.

Description
The species grows as a dense and rigid shrub up to two metres in height, or more in sheltered sites. The thick, oval leaves are 15–30 mm long, with short stalks, toothed margins and sharp, pointed tips. The cream-coloured, scented flowers are clustered on spikes at the ends of the branches. The dry fruits are about 15 mm long, splitting open along one side to release the seeds.

Distribution and habitat
The species has a restricted distribution in the mountains of western Tasmania, where it is a component of alpine deciduous and coniferous heathland. It is considered to be rare under Tasmania's Threatened Species Protection Act 1995.

References

 

milliganii
Endemic flora of Tasmania
Plants described in 1856